Kevin Pollard (born 1958 in Roddickton, Newfoundland and Labrador) is a Canadian politician. He was elected to the Newfoundland and Labrador House of Assembly in a by-election on 27 August 2008, representing the electoral district of Baie Verte-Springdale as a member of the Progressive Conservatives. He was defeated in the 2015 election.

Pollard is an alumnus of A.C. Palmer Collegiate in Roddickton. Pollard attended and graduated from Memorial University of Newfoundland.

He is a former mayor of Springdale.

Electoral record

|-

|-

|Liberal
|Neil Ward
|align="right"|1,827
|align="right"|37.78
|align="right"|+2.61
|-

|NDP
|Tim Howse
|align="right"|456
|align="right"|9.43
|align="right"|+0.46
|}

|-

|-

|Liberal
|Shaun Lane
|align="right"|1,245
|align="right"|35.17
|align="right"|
|-

|New Democratic Party
|Tim Howse
|align="right"|316
|align="right"|8.97
|align="right"|
|-
!align="left" colspan=3|Total
!align="right"|3,540
!align="right"|
!align="right"|

References

External links
 Kevin Pollard's PC Party biography

1958 births
Progressive Conservative Party of Newfoundland and Labrador MHAs
Mayors of places in Newfoundland and Labrador
Living people
21st-century Canadian politicians